Zeuxippus pallidus is a spider species of the jumping spider family, Salticidae. It is found in Bangladesh, Myanmar, China and Vietnam.

Description
The male of Z. pallidus has an orange-brown hairy carapace. On the sides there are greyish-white, long hairs. The abdomen is greyish orange-brown with orange markings and light transverse streaks towards the rear. The legs are yellow-orange, except for the first pair, which is very hairy with long greyish-white and orange-brown hairs. The lighter female has greyish streaks on the sides of the abdomen.

References

External links
 Salticidae.org: Diagnostic drawings

Salticidae
Spiders of Asia
Spiders described in 1895